Several ships have been named Borodino for the 1812 Battle of Borodino:

 was launched at South Shields. She served as a government transport and was wrecked in 1830.
Borodino first appeared in Lloyd's Register in 1826, but with launch year 1810, and launch location "River", i.e., the Thames. In 1828 she transported convicts to New South Wales from Cork. She was last listed in 1833.
 Russian Iezekiil class – Hulked 1847.
 Russian 74-gun ship, cut down as frigate in 1855 – Decommissioned in 1863.
 was built by Andrew Leslie & Co., at Hebburn Yard, Newcastle-on-Tyne. She was of 200 tons grt, and was an iron, one-screw steam ship.
 Russian Borodino class battlecruiser was launched in 1915.

Other ships named Borodino:
German_battleship_Schleswig-Holstein, Pre-dreadnought was renamed Borodino and used as a target ship.

See also
List of ships of the line of Russia
Borodino-class battleship (1901)

Borodino-class battlecruiser
Borodino class training ships
Borodino-class motorship, a class of Russian river passenger ships

Ship names